Helorus is a genus of wasps in the family Heloridae. There are about 12 described species in Helorus, found worldwide Members of the genus are parasitic on green lacewings. The oldest fossils are from Eocene aged Baltic amber.

Species
 Helorus alborzicus Izadizadeh et al., 2015
 Helorus anomalipes (Panzer, 1798)
 Helorus australiensis New, 1975
 Helorus brethesi Ogloblin, 1928
 Helorus celebensis Achterberg, 2006
 Helorus elgoni Risbec, 1950
 Helorus nigripes Foerster, 1856
 Helorus niuginiae Naumann, 1983
 Helorus ruficornis Förster, 1856
 Helorus striolatus Cameron, 1906
 Helorus suwai Kusigemati, 1987
 Helorus yezoensis Kusigemati, 1987
 † Helorus arturi Muona, 2020
 † Helorus festivus Statz, 1938

References

Parasitic wasps
Proctotrupoidea